Kristi is a female name of Latin origin, meaning "follower of Christ". Other spellings include Christie, Christy, Kristy, Kristie, Christi, and Kryste.

Kristi may have originated from, and can be the short form of, many forenames including Kristina, Kristine, Kristen, and Krysten, the common bases of which is "Krist", meaning "Christ".

"Kristi" is most common in the United States, Canada, the United Kingdom, Australia, New Zealand, Germany, Austria, Switzerland, the Netherlands, Belgium, South Africa, and the Scandinavian countries.

Notable people with this name include:

 Kristi Addis (born 1971), American beauty queen from Holcomb, Mississippi, who was Miss Teen USA 1987
 Kristi Albers (born 1963), American professional golfer who played on the LPGA Tour
 Kristi Allik (born 1952), Canadian music educator and composer
 Kristi Andersen, American political scientist
 Kristi Angus (born 1971), Canadian actress
 Kristi Anseth (born 1969), professor at the University of Colorado at Boulder
 Kristi Brooks, American author
 Kristi Capel (born 1983), America television newscaster
 Kristi Castlin (born 1988), American track and field athlete
 Kristi Cirone (born 1987), American basketball coach and former player
 Kristi DeMeester, American horror writer
 Kristi DeVert (born 1973), American former soccer player
 Kristi DeVries (born 1982), American-Dutch softball player
 Kristi DuBose (born 1964), United States district judge
 Kristi Funk (born 1969), American breast cancer surgeon
 Kristi Gannon (born 1982), American field hockey defense and midfield player
 Kristi Gold, American writer
 Kristi Hager (born 1963), former member of the Iowa House of Representatives
 Kristi Harrower (born 1975), Australian former professional basketball player
 Kristi Haskins Johnson (born 1980), United States district judge
 Kristi Hoss Schiller, American Quarter Horse owner and breeder
 Kristi Joti (born 1998), Albanian footballer
 Kristi Kang (born 1984), American voice actress
 Kristi Kiick (born 1967), Professor of Materials Science and Engineering at the University of Delaware
 Kristi Kirshe (born 1994), American rugby sevens player
 Kristi Kote (born 1998), Albanian professional footballer
 Kristi Lauren (born 1994), American actress
 Kristi Lee (born 1960), American radio personality
 Kristi Leskinen (born 1981), American freestyle skier
 Kristi Marku (born 1995), Albanian football player
 Kristi Martel (born 1973), American singer, songwriter, performance artist and yogini
 Kristi Mathieson, American politician
 Kristi Miller (born 1985), American former professional tennis player
 Kristi Mollis, American businesswoman, entrepreneur and education professional
 Kristi Myst (born 1973), American former pornographic actress
 Kristi Mühling (born 1971), Estonian chromatic kannel player
 Kristi Noem (born 1971), American politician
 Kristi Overton Johnson (born 1970), American former water skiing champion, author, and missionary
 Kristi Pinderi (born 1982), Albanian activist advocating for LGBT community
 Kristi Qarri (born 2000), Albanian footballer
 Kristi Qose (born 1995), Albanian footballer
 Kristi Racines (born  1983), American politician
 Kristi Rennekamp (born  1980), American academic
 Kristi Richards (born 1981), Canadian freestyle skier
 Kristi Ross, American entrepreneur
 Kristi Shashkina (born 2003), Estonian-Russian ice hockey player
 Kristi Stassinopoulou (born 1956), Greek singer, lyricist, and fiction writer
 Kristi Sweet (born 1976), American philosopher
 Kristi Tauti (born 1979), American figure competitor, fitness model, and personal trainer
 Kristi Terzian (born 1967), American alpine skier
 Kristi Toliver (born 1987), American-Slovak basketball player
 Kristi Vangjeli (born 1985), Albanian footballer
 Kristi Yamaguchi (born 1971), American figure skater
 Kristi Zea (born 1948), American film producer

See also

References 

Danish feminine given names
Dutch feminine given names
English feminine given names
Feminine given names
Finnish feminine given names
German feminine given names
Icelandic feminine given names
Norwegian feminine given names
Swedish feminine given names